Spain competed at the 2020 Summer Paralympics in Tokyo, Japan from 24 August to 5 September 2021. This was Spain's fourteenth appearance at the Paralympic Games. During the Games, Spanish athletes settled 4 World records and 1 Paralympic record.

Medalists

| width="78%" align="left" valign="top" |

|  style="text-align:left; width:22%; vertical-align:top;"|

Medals by sport

Medals by date

Medals by gender

Archery

Athletics 

Gerard Descarrega Puigdevall, Alberto Suarez Laso, Gustavo Nieves, Kim Lopez Gonzalez and Sara Martínez Puntero are among the athletes to represent Spain at the 2020 Summer Paralympics.
Men's track

Men's field

Women's track

Women's field

Cycling 

Spain sent ten cyclists, all male. Paralympic swimmer Ricardo Ten is debuting in this sport.
Men's road

Men's track

Mixed

Football 5-a-side 

Spain qualified to compete in football 5-a-side at the 2020 Summer Paralympics.

Judo

Paracanoeing 

Spain qualified five boats in Men's KL1, KL3, VL2 & VL3 and Women's KL2 events.

Qualification Legend: FA=Final A (medal); FB=Final B (non-medal)

Powerlifting

Rowing

Spain qualified two boats in the men's single sculls and mixed coxed four events. Javier Reja qualified for the games by winning the gold medal at the 2021 FISA European Qualification Regatta in Varese, Italy. Meanwhile, mixed coxed four crews received the bipartite commission invitation allocation.

Qualification Legend: FA=Final A (medal); FB=Final B (non-medal); R=Repechage

Shooting

Juan Antonio Saavedra Reinaldo qualified to represent Spain at the 2020 Summer Paralympics.

Swimming 

Twenty six Spanish swimmer has qualified.
Men

Women

Mixed

Table tennis

Spain entered six athletes into the table tennis competition at the games. All of them qualified via World Ranking allocation.

Men

Team

Taekwondo

Spain qualified one athletes to compete at the Paralympics competition. Alejandro Vidal Alvarez qualified by finishing top six in world ranking.

Triathlon

Wheelchair basketball

Spain's women's national wheelchair basketball team have qualified in the 2019 Europe Zonal Championships after a fourth-place finish. Netherlands, Great Britain and Germany were already qualified in the 2018 IWBF World Championships.

Wheelchair tennis

Spain qualified four players entries for wheelchair tennis. All of them qualified by the world rankings.

See also
 Spain at the Paralympics
 Spain at the 2020 Summer Olympics

Notes

References

Nations at the 2020 Summer Paralympics
2020
2021 in Spanish sport